Something to Listen To may refer to:

 Something to Listen To (Jimmy McGriff album), 1970 
 Something to Listen To (Nine Days album), 1995